Isolmant–Premac–Vittoria is a professional road bicycle racing women's team which participates in elite women's races.

The team was originally set up in 2006 as an amateur, national-level, team before becoming a professional team in 2018.

Team roster

Major results
2021
Brugherio Cyclo-cross, Gaia Realini

National Champions

2018
 Romania Time Trial, Ana Covrig
 Romania Road Race, Ana Covrig
 Italy Track (Keirin), Martina Fidanza

2019
 Romania Time Trial, Ana Covrig
 Romania Road Race, Ana Covrig
 Italy Track (Keirin), Martina Fidanza

2020
 Latvia Track (Omnium), Lina Svarinska
 Latvia Track (Points race), Lina Svarinska
 European U23 Track (Team Pursuit), Martina Fidanza
 European U23 Track (Scratch race), Martina Fidanza

2021
 Italy U23 Cyclo-cross, Francesca Baroni
 European U23 Track (Team Pursuit), Martina Fidanza
 European U23 Track (Madison), Martina Fidanza
 Italy Track (Madison), Martina Fidanza
 World Track (Scratch race), Martina Fidanza

2022
 Italy U23 Cyclo-cross, Gaia Realini

References

External links

UCI Women's Teams
Cycling teams based in Italy
Cycling teams established in 2006